Nakul Verma (born 14 April 1991) is an Indian cricketer who plays for Services as a wicket-keeper. He made his first-class debut in 2012 for Services against Kerala.

References

External links
 

1991 births
Living people
Indian cricketers
Services cricketers
Place of birth missing (living people)